Guy Lafarge (Périgueux, 5 May 1904 - Paris, 17 December 1990) was a French composer of operettas and popular songs.

Selected compositions

Operettas
Niquette (1930)
Carabas et Cie (1932) 
Monsieur Papillon (1934)
La Course à l'amour (1941)
Il faut marier maman (1950) 
La Leçon d'amour dans un parc (1951) 
Un chapeau de paille d'Italie (Strasbourg, 1966)
L'Œuf à voiles (Nantes, 1977)
Le Petit Café (Mulhouse, 1980) and La Cagnotte (Lille) with Jack Ledru

Chansons
"La Seine", with lyrics by Flavien Monod (paroles) was first sung by :fr:Renée Lamy Pathé 78 and won the Prix de Deauville in 1948. The song was also covered by :fr:Lina Margy, :fr:Jacqueline François, Maurice Chevalier and Colette Renard, as well as by Bing Crosby on the 1953 album Le Bing: Song Hits of Paris.
"La belle amour", lyrics by Francis Carco, entry of France in the Eurovision Song Contest 1957

Film music
Music for the 1953 film La môme vert-de-gris.

References

People from Périgueux
French operetta composers
1904 births
1990 deaths